Jimmy Dale Chapman (September 19, 1935 – September 26, 2019) was a former American football coach. He served as the head football coach at Case Western Reserve University from 1982 to 1986 and at Mercyhurst College—now known as Mercyhurst University—from 1990 to 1992, compiling a career college football coaching record of 47–23–2.

Early years

Chapman graduated from Marion Harding High School in 1953, earning six combined letters in football, basketball, and baseball, including earning first-team all-Buckeye League as defensive back his senior season.

Chapman was a veteran of the United States Marine Corps and graduated Ohio University in 1960 with his bachelor's degree and University of Cincinnati in 1965 with his master's degree.

Coaching

Willoughby South High School
At the high school level, he coached Willoughby South to a 101–35–6 (.732) record from 1968 to 1981, earning five Greater Cleveland Conference championships (1970, 1973, 1974, 1978 and 1980).

Case Western Reserve University
According to Sports Illustrated,  Chapman's 1983 Christmas card to the players read: "9-0 and Number 1 in the NCAC and NCAA."

For the first time in 46 years, the Spartans went undefeated, winning the first ever North Coast Athletic Conference title during its inaugural season in 1984.  Even though they defeated playoff team Washington and Jefferson 34–16 during the regular season, they were not invited to the 8-team 1984 NCAA Division III playoffs.  The Spartans were led by two-time All-American quarterback Fred DiSanto and defensively by three-time All-American Ron Stepanovic.

Chapman achieved a record of 36–7–1 (.830) over his five seasons.  He holds the highest winning percentage (.830) for any Spartans coach in school post-merger history, and is second all-time to only Coach Bill Edwards (.877), the College Football Hall of Fame coach from the Western Reserve Red Cats days.

Honors and death
In 2010, Chapman  was inducted into the Ohio High School Football Coaches Association Hall of Fame (OHSFCA).

Chapman died on September 26, 2019, in Monroe, North Carolina.

Head coaching record

College

References

External links
 

 

1935 births
2019 deaths
Case Western Spartans football coaches
Mercyhurst Lakers football coaches
High school football coaches in Ohio
Ohio University alumni
University of Cincinnati alumni
People from Marion, Ohio
People from Willoughby, Ohio
Coaches of American football from Ohio